Gordon Springs, also called Gordon Spring or Gordons, is a spring and its associated settlement in Whitfield County, Georgia, United States. Gordon Spring Creek flows out of it into Chickamauga Creek.

Bodies of water of Whitfield County, Georgia
Springs of Georgia (U.S. state)